The First Secession was an exodus of ministers and members from the Church of Scotland in 1733.  Those who took part formed the Associate Presbytery and later the United Secession Church. They were often referred to as seceders.

The underlying principles of the split focused upon issues of ecclesiology and ecclesiastical polity, especially in the perceived threat lay patronage represented to the right of a congregation to choose its own minister. These issues had their roots in seventeenth century controversies between presbyterian and episcopal factions in the Church of Scotland. 

This was complicated by the fact that most ministers, by tradition, were the younger sons from the aristocratic families, and those same families were usually the local landowners. The local landowner therefore would often act as a "patron" to the church, not only through gifting of money, but through supply of their own relatives to fill the role of minister.

There were of course some ministers from more humble backgrounds, but these frequently found it very hard to receive nomination for any post, lacking the family connections then required.

Unlike later schisms, where the country congregations were the main participants, the main advocates of the Secession Church were the town dwellers, and most large Scottish towns had a Secession Church.

History

The Patronage Act of 1711 laid a bed of general unrest amongst the Church of Scotland, laying down set rules on how ministers were to be chosen and based on very non-Scottish ideas of feudal hierarchy, more a product of the Act of Union of 1707 than of traditional Scottish approach to issues.

The First Secession arose out of an Act of the  General Assembly of 1732, which was passed despite the disapproval of the large majority of individual presbyteries. This restricted to Heritors and  Elders the right of nominating Ministers to vacancies where the Patron had not nominated within six months. When Ebenezer Erskine wished to have his dissent recorded, it was found that a previous Act of 1730 had removed the right of recorded dissent, and so the protests of the dissenters were refused. In the following October, Ebenezer Erskine, minister at Stirling, and, at the time, Moderator of the  Synod of Stirling preached a sermon referring to the act as unscriptural and unconstitutional. Members of the synod objected, and he was censured.  On appeal, the censure was affirmed by the Assembly in May 1733, but Erskine refused to recant.  He was joined in his protest by William Wilson, Alexander Moncrieff and James Fisher. They were regarded by the Assembly as being in contempt.  When they still refused to recant, in November the protesting ministers were suspended. They replied by protesting that they still adhered to the principles of the Church, whilst at the same time seceding.

In December 1733 they constituted themselves into a new presbytery. In 1734 they published their first testimony, with a statement of the grounds of their secession, which made prominent reference to the doctrinal laxity of previous General Assemblies. In 1736 they proceeded to exercise judicial powers as a church court, published a judicial testimony, and began to organize churches in various parts of the country. Having been joined by four other ministers, including the well-known Ralph Erskine, they appointed Wilson Professor of Divinity. For these acts proceedings were again instituted against them in the General Assembly, and they were in 1740 all deposed and ordered to be ejected from their churches. Meanwhile, the membership of their 'Associate Presbytery' steadily increased, until in 1745 there were forty-five congregations, and it was reconstituted into an 'Associate Synod'.

In 1747 the Secession Church split following introduction of the Oath of Burghers, creating the Burghers and Anti-Burghers. In towns where the split occurred the churches were known as the Burgher Church and Anti-Burgher Church. In towns without such a split it continued to be known as simply the Secession Church.

A Second Secession from the Church of Scotland occurred in 1761, with Thomas Gillespie and others. This was called the Presbytery of Relief or more usually simply the Relief Church.

In 1847, this denomination united with the United Secession Church (formed in 1820 from the union of the New Licht Burghers and New Licht Anti-Burghers) to form the United Presbyterian Church.

Theological Professors
1. William Wilson (1736-1741)

2. Alexander Moncrieff (1741-1747)

See also
Marrow Controversy
Thomas Mair
Thomas Nairn

References
Citations

Sources

Bibliography
 Acts of the General Assembly of the Church of Scotland 1730, 1732, 1734. Church Law Society, Edinburgh, 1843, British History Online 
 Knight, Charles. The English Cyclopaedia: a New Dictionary of Universal Knowledge, Volume VIII, pp. 487-494. Bradbury and Evans, London, 1861. 
 Fraser, Donald. The Life and Diary of the Reverend Ebenezer Erskine, A.M.: of Stirling, Father of the Secession Church, to which is prefixed a memoir of his father, the Rev. Henry Erskine, of Chirnside. W Oliphant, Edinburgh, 1831. 
 VanDoodewaard, William. The Marrow Controversy and Seceder Tradition. Reformation Heritage Books, Grand Rapids, 2011. 

Schisms in Christianity
1733 in Scotland
1733 in Christianity
History of the Church of Scotland
Presbyterianism in Scotland
Church of Scotland